Annable is a surname. Notable people with the surname include:

 Charles Annable (1905–1957), English rugby league footballer 
 Dave Annable (born 1979), American actor
 Graham Annable (born 1970), Canadian cartoonist and animator 
 Odette Annable (born 1985), American actress